Libonectes is an extinct genus of sauropterygian reptile belonging to the plesiosaur order. It is known from specimens found in the Britton Formation of Texas (USA) and the Akrabou Formation of Morocco, which have been dated to the lower Turonian stage of the late Cretaceous period.

Nomenclature 
The prefix "libo" comes from Greek, and means "southern," translated to English. "Nectes," the suffix, is also from Greek, and translates to "swimmer." In its entirety, Libonectes can be interpreted as "southern swimmer." Libonectes was an elasmosaurid plesiosaur, with many specimens unearthed in southern parts of North America- as a result, it was labeled with such a name as described in the preceding sentence. C.G. Morgan is credited with the discovery of the first Libonectes fossils, and it was for this reason that morgani was chosen as its binomial name.

Description
The animal was very similar to the related Thalassomedon, though the structure of the neck vertebrae were different, with taller neural spines and longer supporting processes of the bone, and its nostrils were slightly closer to the tip of the skull. The type specimen of L. morgani contains the best preserved elasmosaurid skull known as well as gastroliths. A shoulder girdle and flipper were also found but were apparently discarded at some point in the past.

The specimen was originally named Elasmosaurus morgani by Welles in 1949, but it was reclassified to its own genus by Carpenter in 1997. A second species, L. atlasense, was named in 2005 from deposits in Morocco, but a 2017 redescription of the material recognized it as a junior synonym of L. morgani.

Feeding Habits 
The possible carnivorous nature of Libonectes is suggested by its dental layout, however, the presence of gastroliths inside some known fossils feasibly indicates an omnivorous lifestyle (though paleontological investigation notes that plesiosaurs may have used gastroliths in buoyancy control). The presence of these gastroliths could also point to the possibility that Libonectes swallowed prey items whole. Libonectes most likely hunted in deep waters, perhaps eating small fish and ammonites, as it is thought that its bulk prevented the creature from frequenting shallow waters. This reptile is also suspected to have used its large size to trap prey, as a result of its slow swimming speed.

See also

List of plesiosaur genera
 Timeline of plesiosaur research

References

External links 
Libonectes morgani. Sachs Vertebrate Palaeontology Research.

Late Cretaceous plesiosaurs of North America
Elasmosaurids
Fossil taxa described in 1997
Taxa named by Kenneth Carpenter
Sauropterygian genera